Turbiv is an urban-type settlement in Vinnytsia Raion, in Vinnytsia Oblast, Ukraine, located in the historic region of Podolia. Population: 

Turbiv is situated 31 km from Lypovets (raion center) and 25 km from Vinnytsia.

History 

It was founded in 1545. Until the Partitions of Poland Turbów was part of the Bracław Voivodeship of the Lesser Poland Province of the Polish Crown.

References

Urban-type settlements in Vinnytsia Raion
Berdichevsky Uyezd